Midway Corner is an unincorporated community in Crittenden County, Arkansas, United States.

References

Unincorporated communities in Crittenden County, Arkansas
Unincorporated communities in Arkansas